Chiguayante is a Chilean city and commune in Concepción Province, Biobío Region. It is part of Greater Concepción.

Demographics
Of these, 81,238 (99.9%) lived in urban areas and 64 (0.1%) in rural areas. The population grew by 44.2% (24,931 persons) between the 1992 and 2002 censuses. It had an estimated 2010 population of 119,265.

Administration
As a commune, Chiguayante is a third-level administrative division of Chile administered by a municipal council, headed by an alcalde who is directly elected every four years. The 2008-2012 alcalde is Tomás Solis Nova (PS).

Within the electoral divisions of Chile, Chiguayante is represented in the Chamber of Deputies by José Miguel Ortiz (PDC) and Enrique Van Rysselberghe (UDI) as part of the 44th electoral district, (together with Concepción and San Pedro de la Paz). The commune is represented in the Senate by Alejandro Navarro Brain (MAS) and Hosain Sabag Castillo (PDC) as part of the 12th senatorial constituency (Biobío-Cordillera).

References

External links
  Municipality of Chiguayante

Communes of Chile
Populated places in Concepción Province
1996 establishments in Chile